The Abduction of the Sabine Women is a 1954 West German musical comedy film directed by Kurt Hoffmann and starring Gustav Knuth, Fita Benkhoff and Paul Hörbiger.

The film's sets were designed by the art directors Hermann Warm, Erich Grave and Paul Markwitz. It was shot at the Spandau Studios in Berlin and on location in Bavaria.

Cast
Gustav Knuth as Emanuel Striese
Fita Benkhoff as Frau Striese
Paul Hörbiger as Professor Martin Gollwitz
Loni Heuser as Frau Friederike Gollwitz
Anneliese Kaplan as Renate Gollwitz
Bully Buhlan as Charly Gross
Ernst Waldow as Emil Gross
Willi Rose as mayor
Ruth Stephan as Maid Rosa
Wolfgang Müller as Friedrich
Edith Hancke as Fräulein Müller-Muthesius
Hans Stiebner as Perchtramer
Jakob Tiedtke as Chief baker
Herbert Weissbach as Professor of Biology
Margitta Sonke as Iphigenie Striese
Norbert Steinkrauß as Othello Striese
Wolfgang Condrus as Hamlet Striese
Ekkehard Lau as Torquato Striese
Friedrich Domin as Dichter
Wolfgang Jansen
Egon Vogel

See also
The Abduction of the Sabine Women (1928)
The Abduction of the Sabine Women (1936)
Romulus and the Sabines (Italy, 1945)

References

External links

1954 musical comedy films
German musical comedy films
West German films
Films directed by Kurt Hoffmann
German films based on plays
Films about theatre
Films shot at Spandau Studios
Remakes of German films
German black-and-white films
1950s German-language films
1950s German films